Isara aikeni is a species of sea snail, a marine gastropod mollusk in the family Mitridae, the miters or miter snails.

Description

Isara aikeni are elongated, reddish-orange colored shells.  They have a point on one end and are open on the other.  Shell size around 20-40 mm.

Distribution

References

Mitridae
Gastropods described in 2009